Kosmos 606 ( or Cosmos 606) was a Soviet US-K missile early warning satellite which was launched in 1973 as part of the Soviet military's Oko programme. The satellite was designed to identify missile launches using optical telescopes and infrared sensors.

Launch 
Kosmos 606 was launched from Site 41/1 at Plesetsk Cosmodrome in the Russian SSR. A Molniya-M carrier rocket with a 2BL upper stage was used to perform the launch, which took place at 13:01 UTC on 2 November 1973.

Orbit 
The launch successfully placed the satellite into a molniya orbit. It subsequently received its Kosmos designation, and the international designator 1973-084A . The United States Space Command assigned it the Satellite Catalog Number 6916.

See also

 List of Kosmos satellites (501–750)
 List of R-7 launches (1970-1974)
 1973 in spaceflight
 List of Oko satellites

References

Kosmos satellites
1973 in spaceflight
Oko
Spacecraft launched by Molniya-M rockets
Spacecraft launched in 1973